Memories is a solo piano album by Abdullah Ibrahim, recorded in 1973. It was reissued under the title ...Memories.

Recording and music
The album was recorded in December 1973. It contains a tribute to Ibrahim's wife, Sathima Bea Benjamin.

Release and reception

Memories was released by Philips Records in Japan. It was later issued on CD and LP by West Wind Records, under the title ...Memories. The AllMusic reviewer concluded that "this solo piano set by Abdullah Ibrahim is spiritual, authoritative, melodic, wistful, nostalgic, and powerful, and grows in interest with each listen."

Track listing
"Township Sunday"
"Our Son Tsakwe"
"Love Song for Bea"
"Memories"
"Carnival"
"Majestic Warriors"
"Gafsa – Life Is for the Living, Death Is for Us All"

Personnel
Abdullah Ibrahim – piano

References

Abdullah Ibrahim albums
Solo piano jazz albums
1973 albums